Rima Khelil (born 21 March 1989) is an Algerian team handball player. She plays for the club Rija, and on the Algerian national team. She represented Algeria at the 2013 World Women's Handball Championship in Serbia, where the Algerian team placed 22nd.

References

1989 births
Living people
Algerian female handball players
21st-century Algerian people